Alice Springs Golf Club - Now Closed  (Welsh: Clwb Golff Alice Springs) is a former golf club based just outside Usk at Monmouthshire, Wales. Alice Springs was a 36-hole golf complex with 40 Buggys, all fitted with GPS systems. It was an all-weather course with no temporary greens. The club's 2 courses were open to the public, as were the clubhouse facilities and restaurant which were also open to the general non playing public. Wales and Scarlets prop Iestyn Thomas amongst others had played at the club.  It is now permanently closed.

As of 2011 there is also an Alice Springs Golf Club in central Australia.

References

Review: 

Golf clubs and courses in Wales
Golf club